Jack Cohen may refer to:

Jack Cohen (biologist) (1933–2019), British biologist and special effects consultant
Jack Cohen (politician) (1886–1965), British Conservative Party politician, Member of Parliament for Liverpool Fairfield 1918–1931
Jack Cohen (businessman) (1898–1979), British businessman, founded Tesco
Jack Cohen (rabbi) (1919–2012), American Reconstructionist rabbi

See also
John Cohen (disambiguation)
Jacob Cohen (disambiguation)